Folk Hero & Funny Guy is a 2016 American comedy film written, directed, and produced by Jeff Grace, in his directorial debut. It stars  Alex Karpovsky, Wyatt Russell, Meredith Hagner, Michael Ian Black, Hannah Simone, Heather Morris, Melanie Lynskey, and David Cross.

The film had its world premiere at the Tribeca Film Festival on April 16, 2016. It was released in a limited release and through video on demand on May 12, 2017, by Gravitas Ventures.

Plot
Successful singer-songwriter plans to help his friend with his struggling comedy career by hiring him as his opening act on his solo tour.

Cast

 Alex Karpovsky as Paul
 Wyatt Russell as Jason
 Meredith Hagner as Bryn
 Michael Ian Black as Randy
 Hannah Simone as Emily
 Heather Morris as Nicole
 Melanie Lynskey as Becky
 David Cross as Chris DeRose
 Sarah Arnold as Kelly
 Alex McKenna as Stacy
 Rachel Staman as Sky
 Thida Penn as Belina
 Jessica Megan Rivera as Anasctacia
 Todd Berger as Johnny 
 Blaise Miller as Doug
 Kevin M. Brennann as Robbie Nelson
 Mike C. Manning as Cardie

Production
In November 2013, a Kickstarter campaign was unveiled to raise funds for the film, with a $50,000 goal being reached. It was also confirmed Jeff Grace would direct the film, from a screenplay he wrote, with Alex Karpovsky, Liza Oppenheimer, starring in the film, while Adam Ezra would be composing the film, as well as composing original songs. In June 2014, it was revealed that Wyatt Russell and Melanie Lynskey joined the cast of the film, with Ryland Aldrich producing alongside Grace. In January 2015, Heather Morris and Meredith Hagner joined the cast of the film.

Release
The film had its world premiere at the Tribeca Film Festival on April 16, 2016. Shortly after, Gravitas Ventures acquired distribution rights to the film and set it for a limited release and through video on demand on May 12, 2017.

Reception
Folk Hero & Funny Guy received positive reviews from film critics. , 77% of the 22 critical reviews compiled on review aggregator website Rotten Tomatoes are positive, with an average rating of 6.14/10.

Kate Walsh of Indiewire.com gave the film a B writing : "“Folk Hero & Funny Guy” is an amiable road movie powered by great music. But it’s much more than just that, with deeply felt, lived in emotions capturing the ups and downs of longterm friendships, the nervous spark of a new attraction, and the power of making amends. It’s a fine showcase for the ranges of Russell and Karpovsky, as well as the winsome Hagner, and signals Grace as a filmmaker to watch."

References

External links

2016 films
American comedy road movies
2016 comedy films
American independent films
Kickstarter-funded films
2016 directorial debut films
2016 independent films
2010s English-language films
2010s American films